Annie Ducaux (10 September 1908 – 31 December 1996) was a French actress, who appeared in 40 film and television productions between 1932 and 1980. Ducaux was a shareholder in the state theater Comédie-Française from 1948, and played in numerous stage productions there. She is possibly best-remembered for her roles in such films as Abel Gance's Beethoven's Great Love (1937), Conflict (1938, opposite Corinne Luchaire) and Les grandes familles (1958, opposite Jean Gabin).

She was born Anne Marie Catherine Ducaux in Besançon, Doubs, Franche-Comté, and died in Champeaux, Seine-et-Marne, Île-de-France. She was married to the Swiss film producer Ernest Rupp, and had one child the French film producer Gérard Ducaux-Rupp.

Filmography 
 1932 : Coup de feu à l'aube dir. Serge de Poligny (Irène Taft)
 1933 : Une rencontre - short - dir. René-Guy Grand
 1933 : Le Gendre de Monsieur Poirier dir. Marcel Pagnol (Antoinette)
 1933 : Le Fakir du Grand Hôtel dir. Pierre Billon (Suzanne Méria)
 1933 : The Agony of the Eagles dir. Roger Richebé (Lise Dorian)
 1934 : Little Jacques dir. Gaston Roudès (Claire Mortal)
 1934 : Night in May dir. Henri Chomette et Gustav Ucicky (Emperess Marie-Thérèse) 
 1934 : Cessez le feu dir. Jacques de Baroncelli (Françoise)
 1935 : Un homme de trop à bord dir. Gerhard Lamprecht and Roger Le Bon (Suzanne Egert)
 1936 : Beethoven's Great Love dir. Abel Gance (Therese de Brunswick)
 1936 : The Two Boys dir. Fernand Rivers (Colette)
 1937 : Les Filles du Rhône dir. Jean-Paul Paulin (Frédérique) 
 1938 : La Vierge folle dir. Henri Diamant-Berger (Fanny Armaury) 
 1938 : Conflict dir. Léonide Moguy (Catharine) 
 1938 : The Woman Thief dir. Abel Gance (Anita)
 1938 : Prison sans barreaux dir. Léonide Moguy (Yvonne Chanel, the warden)
 1940 : L'Empreinte du dieu dir. Léonide Moguy (Wilfrida) 
 1940 : Thunder Over Paris dir. Bernard Deschamps (Jeanne Desmarets)
 1940 : The Man from Niger dir. Jacques de Baroncelli (Danièle Mourrier)
 1942 : Pontcarral, colonel d'empire dir. Jean Delannoy (Garlone) 
 1942 : Dernière aventure dir. Robert Péguy (Georgina) 
 1943 : The Inevitable Monsieur Dubois  dir. Pierre Billon (Hélène Mareuil)
 1944 : Florence est folle dir. Georges Lacombe (Lucile)
 1944 : Le Bal des passants dir. Guillaume Radot (Fabienne Ozanne)
 1946 : Patrie dir. Louis Daquin
 1947 : The Sharks of Gibraltar dir. Emil-Edwin Reinert (Stella)
 1947 : Rendezvous in Paris dir. Gilles Grangier (Catherine Laurence)
 1947 : Dreams of Love dir. Christian Stengel  Marie d'Agoult
 1949 : The King dir. Marc-Gilbert Sauvajon (Therese Marnix)
 1949 : La Patronne dir. Robert Dhéry (Agnès)
 1958 : Les Grandes familles dir. Denys de La Patellière (Adéle Schoudler)
 1958 : La Caméra explore le temps (TV) dir. Stellio Lorenzi episode: La mort de Marie-Antoinette Marie-Antoinette
 1961 : La Belle Américaine dir. Robert Dhéry (Mme Lucanzas)
 1961 : La Princesse de Clèves dir. Jean Delannoy (Diane de Poitiers)
 1963 : Le Chevalier de Maison-Rouge (TV) dir. Claude Barma Marie-Antoinette
 1972 : Les Femmes savantes (by Molière), telefilm directed by Jean Vernier (Philaminte)
 1972 : Électre (TV) dir. Pierre Dux Clytemnestre
 1975 : Les Ailes de la colombe (TV) dir. Daniel Georgeot (Maud)
 1980 : Les Enquêtes du commissaire Maigret, episode : Maigret et les Vieillards dir. Stéphane Bertin : Jacqueline Larrieu de Saint-Phar known as Jacquette
 1980 : La Folle de Chaillot (TV) dir. Georges Paumier (title role)

Notes

External links

Annie DUCAUX at Premiere.fr
Brief biography

1908 births
1996 deaths
French film actresses
French stage actresses
Actors from Besançon
Sociétaires of the Comédie-Française
French television actresses
20th-century French actresses